Badung Strait is a strait on the south east side of Bali in Indonesia.
It lies between the islands of Bali and Nusa Penida. It is about 60 km long and 20 km wide.

History 
In February 1942, the battle of Badung Strait was fought here.
It is usually reported as a body of water that has accidents and mishaps

Tourist attractions 
On the shores of the bay are resort and tourist areas, which are widely known internationally, in particular, Nusa Dua, Tanjung Benoa and Sanur.

References

Straits of Indonesia
Landforms of Bali
Lesser Sunda Islands